John Wood is an English former professional rugby league footballer who played in the 1970s and 1980s.

Playing career

International honours
John Wood won a cap for Great Britain while at Leigh in 1982 against France.

John Wood played at right-, i.e. number 10, in Great Britain's 7-8 defeat by France in the friendly at Stadio Pier Luigi Penzo, Venice on Saturday 31 July 1982.

Challenge Cup Final appearances
John Wood played right-, i.e. number 10, in Widnes' 5-20 defeat by St. Helens in the 1976 Challenge Cup Final during the 1975–76 season at Wembley Stadium, London on Saturday 8 May 1976.

Player's No.6 Trophy Final appearances
John Wood played right-, i.e. number 10, in Widnes' 19-13 victory over Hull F.C. in the 1975–76 Player's No.6 Trophy Final during the 1975–76 season at Headingley Rugby Stadium, Leeds on Saturday 24 January 1976

References

External links
!Great Britain Statistics at englandrl.co.uk (statistics currently missing due to not having appeared for both Great Britain, and England)
Statistics at rugby.widnes.tv
Statistics at wigan.rlfans.com

1956 births
Living people
Great Britain national rugby league team players
Leigh Leopards players
London Broncos players
Rugby league players from Widnes
Rugby league props
Salford Red Devils players
Widnes Vikings players
Wigan Warriors players